Glynne Thomas (5 May 1935 – 21 February 2021) was a British ice hockey player.

Career
He played for the Southampton Vikings, Wembley Lions and Streatham Redskins during the 1960s, 1970s and 1980s. He also played for the Great Britain national ice hockey team at the 1961 and 1972 Ice Hockey World Championships. He was inducted to the British Ice Hockey Hall of Fame in 1991.

Thomas died in February 2021 at the age of 85.

References

External links
 British Ice Hockey Hall of Fame entry

1935 births
2021 deaths
British Ice Hockey Hall of Fame inductees
English ice hockey goaltenders
Wembley Lions players
People from London
Place of death missing